This page includes a list of biblical proper names that start with O in English transcription. Some of the names are given with a proposed etymological meaning. For further information on the names included on the list, the reader may consult the sources listed below in the References and External Links.

A – B – C – D – E – F – G – H – I – J – K – L – M – N – O – P – Q – R – S – T – U – V – Y – Z

O

Obadiah
Obal
Obed
Obed-Edom
Obil
Oboth
Ocran
Oded
Og
Ohad
Ohel
Olympas
Omar
Omega
Omri
On
Onan
Onesimus
Onesiphorus
Ono
Ophel
Ophir
Ophni
Ophrah
Oreb
Oren
Ornan
Orpah
Oshea
Othni
Othniel
Ozem
Ozias
Ozni

References
Comay, Joan, Who's Who in the Old Testament, Oxford University Press, 1971,  
Lockyer, Herbert, All the men of the Bible, Zondervan Publishing House (Grand Rapids, Michigan), 1958
Lockyer, Herbert, All the women of the Bible, Zondervan Publishing 1988, 
Lockyer, Herbert, All the Divine Names and Titles in the Bible, Zondervan Publishing 1988,  
Tischler, Nancy M., All things in the Bible: an encyclopedia of the biblical world , Greenwood Publishing, Westport, Conn. : 2006

Inline references 

O